George Mofokeng (born 20 June 1979 in Ganyesa) is a South African association football defender who last played for Platinum Stars. He was capped thrice for South Africa.

References

1979 births
Living people
People from Kagisano-Molopo Local Municipality
South African Tswana people
South African soccer players
Association football defenders
South Africa international soccer players
Cape Town Spurs F.C. players
SuperSport United F.C. players
Platinum Stars F.C. players
National First Division players
South African Premier Division players